Oleksandr Kolchenko (born September 20, 1988) is a Ukrainian basketball player for BC Ternopil and the Ukrainian national team.

With Ukraine, Kolchenko played at the EuroBasket 2017.

References

1988 births
Living people
BC Cherkaski Mavpy players
BC Khimik players
BC Budivelnyk players
BC Azovmash players
BC Politekhnika-Halychyna players
BC Avtodor Saratov players
BC Nevėžis players
Ukrainian expatriate sportspeople in Lithuania
Ukrainian expatriate sportspeople in Russia
People from Tiraspol
Small forwards
Ukrainian men's basketball players
Ukrainian people of Moldovan descent
Ukrainian men's 3x3 basketball players